This is a list of commercially released songs by the British boy band Take That, details of remixes and 'concert only' tracks can be found later in the article. There are currently 139 Take That songs that have been commercially released as studio recordings, including 16 from their latest album Wonderland. All are listed below.



Songs on Take That's commercially released albums

Studio albums 
 Take That & Party
 Everything Changes
 Nobody Else
 Beautiful World
 The Circus
 Progress
 III
 Wonderland

Extended plays 
 Progressed

Compilation albums 
 Greatest Hits
 The Best of Take That
 Forever... Greatest Hits
 Never Forget – The Ultimate Collection
 The Platinum Collection
 Odyssey

Songs

Songs not released as a studio recording
Released on music albums
 "Rock 'N' Roll Medley" - Released as a live recording on Forever... Greatest Hits
 "Motown Medley" - Released as a live recording on Forever... Greatest Hits
 "Clap Your Hands" - Released as a live recording on "Why Can't I Wake Up with You" (limited edition 7" version)
 "Take That Medley" - Released as a live recording on "A Million Love Songs" (Japanese version)
 "When They Were Young" - Released as a live medley on Progress Live

Released on other media
 "Apache 2006" - released as a live recording on Take That: The Ultimate Tour DVD
 "Let It Rain" - released as a live recording on Take That: The Ultimate Tour DVD

Unreleased
 "Rain Song" - Listed on ASCAP as copyrighted by the band, but never performed (possibly a misnomer for "Let It Rain")
 "Gun" - Seen as one of the listed tracks for the album "Progress" on the Take That documentary "Look Back, Don't Stare"

Commercially released remixes

 "Do What U Like" (club mix)
 "Do What U Like" (radio mix)
 "Do What U Like" (12" mix)
 "Promises" (7" radio mix)
 "Promises" (12" mix)
 "Once You've Tasted Love" (aural mix)
 "Once You've Tasted Love" (radio version)
 "Once You've Tasted Love" (Harding & Curnow Remix)
 "Guess Who Tasted Love" (Remix of "Once You've Tasted Love") Take That & Party, Once You've Tasted Love
 "Guess Who Tasted Love" (Guess Who Mix)
 "It Only Takes a Minute" (7" version)
 "It Only Takes a Minute" (Deep Club Mix)
 "It Only Takes a Minute" (Wright Vocal Mix)
 "It Only Takes a Minute" (new remix - radio version)
 "It Only Takes a Minute" (club version)
 "It Only Takes a Minute" (dub version)
 "It Only Takes a Minute" (underground vocal)
 "It Only Takes a Minute" (underground instrumental)
 "It Only Takes a Minute" (Royal Rave Mix)
 "It Only Takes a Minute" (Dem Drums)
 "It Only Takes a Minute" (Blondapella)
 "It Only Takes a Minute" (Love Dub)
 "It Only Takes a Minute" (Tommy Musto Underground Vocal)
 "It Only Takes a Minute" (Tommy Musto Underground Dub)
 "I Found Heaven" (7" radio mix)
 "I Found Heaven" (classic 12" mix)
 "I Found Heaven" (original 12" mix)
 "I Found Heaven" (Mr. F's Garage Mix)
 "Why Can't I Wake Up with You" (radio edit)
 "Why Can't I Wake Up with You?" (7" version) from Everything Changes
 "A Million Love Songs" (7" edit) A Million Love Songs, Back for Good
 "A Million Love Songs" (Lovers' Mix)
 "A Million Love Songs" (extended mix)
 "Could It Be Magic" (Deep in Rapino's Club Mix)
 "Could It Be Magic" (Take That Club Megamix)
 "Could It Be Magic" (Mr. F. Mix)
 "Could It Be Magic" (Rapino Radio Mix) Could It Be Magic, Take That & Party
 "Could It Be Magic" (Take That Radio Megamix)
 "Could It Be Magic" (a cappella)
 "Could It Be Magic" (Ciao Baby Mix)
 "Could It Be Magic" (Rapino Dub)
 "Could It Be Magic" (Paparazzo Mix)
 "Could It Be Magic" (Deep in Rapino's Dub)
 "Could It Be Magic" (Club Rapino Mix)
 "Why Can't I Wake Up with You" (1992 version)
 "Why Can't I Wake Up with You" (radio edit) Why Can't I Wake Up with You, Back for Good
 "Why Can't I Wake Up with You" (7" mix)
 "Why Can't I Wake Up with You" (club mix) Why Can't I Wake Up with You, Sure
 "Why Can't I Wake Up with You" (acoustic version)
 "Pray" (radio edit) Pray, Back for Good
 "Pray" (a cappella)
 "Pray" (alternative club mix)
 "Pray" (swing club mix)
 "Relight My Fire" (radio version)
 "Relight My Fire" (full-length version)
 "Relight My Fire" (Late Night Mix)
 "Relight My Fire" (All Night Mix)
 "Relight My Fire" (Night Beats)
 "Relight My Fire" (Percacapella)
 "Relight My Fire" (Love to Infinity Mix)
 "Relight My Fire" (Greed Mix)
 "Relight My Fire" (Element Remix) Relight My Fire, Never Forget: The Ultimate Collection
 "Babe" (Return Remix) Everything Changes
 "The Party Remix" Everything Changes, Forever... Greatest Hits
 "Never Want to Let You Go" (New Studio Mix) Take That & Party
 "Everything Changes" (7" version) Everything Changes
 "Everything Changes" (Nigel Lowis Remix) Everything Changes (album)
 "Everything Changes" (Nigel Lowis Extended Version)
 "Love Ain't Here Anymore" (US version) Nobody Else
 "You Are The One" (Tonic mix)  Sure
 "Sure" (Thumpers Club Mix)
 "Sure" (Full Pressure Mix) Sure, Nobody Else
 "Sure" (Strictly Barking Dub)
 "Sure" (Brothers in Rhythm Mix)
 "Back for Good" (Radio Mix)
 "Back for Good" (Album Instrumental) Back for Good, Nobody Else
 "Back for Good" (Radio Instrumental)
 "Back for Good" (Urban Mix) Back for Good, Nobody Else
 "Back for Good" (Urban Instrumental)
 "Back For Good" (TV Mix)
 "Never Forget" (single mix radio edit)>
 "Never Forget" (single mix)
 "Patience" (stripped-down version) Shine
 "Patience" (Abbey Road version)  The Greatest Day – Take That Present: The Circus Live
 "Shine" (radio mix) Shine
 "Shine" (Abbey Road version)
 "I'd Wait for Life" (radio edit)
 "We All Fall Down" (acoustic) Reach Out, Beautiful World Tour Edition
 "Rule the World" (radio edit)
 "Rule the World" (Abbey Road version)
 "Greatest Day" (radio mix)
 "Greatest Day" (Abbey Road version)
 "Up All Night" (radio mix)
 "Up All Night" (Abbey Road version) The Greatest Day – Take That Present: The Circus Live
 "The Garden" (radio edit)
 "The Garden" (Abbey Road version) The Greatest Day – Take That Present: The Circus Live
 "How Did It Come to This" (Abbey Road version)
 "What Is Love" (Abbey Road version)
 "The Circus" (Abbey Road version)
 "Julie" (Abbey Road version)
 "Said It All" (Abbey Road version)
 "The Flood" (instrumental)  
 "The Flood" (radio edit) The Flood
 "Revenge of the Kidz" (Remix of "Kidz")
 "Happy Now" (Paul Oakenfold Radio Edit)
 "Happy Now" (Benny Benassi Radio Edit)
 "Happy Now" (Paul Oakenfold Remix)
 "Happy Now" (Benny Benassi Remix)
 "Love Love" (X-Men version) 
 "When We Were Young" (single version)
 "When We Were Young" (single instrumental)
 "Eight Letters" (demo version) Deluxe edition of the Robbie Williams album Take the Crown
 "These Days" (instrumental)
 "These Days" (Steve Pitron & Max Sanna Club Mix) Digital Deluxe edition of III
 "Let in the Sun" (Monsieur Adi Remix)
 "Let in the Sun" (Instrumental)
 "Higher Than Higher" (Instrumental)
 "Hey Boy" (7th Heaven Club Mix)
 "Hey Boy" (7th Heaven Radio Edit)

References

 
Take That
Take That